Allen Cliffton White (born May 17, 1942) is an American character actor. He has appeared in various movies, such as Airplane! and Airplane II: The Sequel, and Back to the Future Part II. Over the course of his Hollywood acting career, White has frequently portrayed police detectives in television and film.

Career

On screen, White is perhaps best known for his role in hit comedy Airplane! as the jive-talking man whose words have to be translated (he reprised the jive-talking for a courtroom scene in the sequel). He also acted in Back to the Future Part II and has a long television resume, including roles in popular shows Wonder Woman, The Jeffersons. The Incredible Hulk and The Dukes of Hazzard, and more recently CSI: Miami and The King of Queens.

White, who was raised in San Francisco, California from an early age, decided to embark on an acting career after he had been employed as a janitor in Golden Gate Park for eight years. White has won a number of awards for his theatre work. He later became a member of the American Conservatory Theater company for three years, performing in more than seventeen plays, from Shakespeare to playwright Tennessee Williams, who was playwright in residence at the time. White originated the role of the military officer in Williams' play This Is (An Entertainment). In 1975, the group went to the Soviet Union for a bicentennial cultural exchange, performing at the Bolshoi Theater in Moscow, as well as in Leningrad and Riga.

Partial filmography
They Call Me Mister Tibbs! (1970) - Spectator Outside Church (uncredited)
The Hollywood Knights (1980) - Louis
Airplane! (1980) - Second Jive Dude
The Dukes of Hazzard (1982) - Burnett
Gangster Wars (1981) - Big Joe Isson
Airplane II: The Sequel (1982) - Witness
The Dukes of Hazzard (1984) - Eddie Scoggins
Massive Retaliation (1984) - Highway Patrolman
Black Moon Rising (1986) - Maintenance Man
Big Trouble (1986) - Mr. Williams
Omega Syndrome (1986) - Sergeant Carlyle
Critical Condition (1987) - Reggie
Russkies (1987) - Captain Foley
Red Scorpion (1988) - Kallunda Kintash
Liberty & Bash (1989) - Detective Anderson
Back to the Future Part II (1989) - Lewis (Dad)
Servants of Twilight (1991) - Pete Lockburn
Leprechaun 2 (1994) - Desk Sergeant
Bombmeister (1995)
Perfect Opposites (2004) - Dr. Barrett
A Night at the Silent Movie Theater (2012) - Al - Dad

References

External links

Shockya interview with actor Al White, June 6, 2009, accessed 2011/1/20.

1942 births
Living people
American male film actors
Male actors from San Francisco
Male actors from Houston
American male stage actors
American male television actors
African-American male actors
20th-century American male actors
21st-century American male actors
20th-century African-American people
21st-century African-American people